Whispering Hope is a 1962 album by Jo Stafford and Gordon MacRae. The lead song and title track was originally recorded in 1949, reaching No. 4 on the charts.

Track listing 

 "Whispering Hope"
 "Abide With Me"
 "In the Garden"
 "Beyond the Sunset"
 "Beautiful Isle of Somewhere"
 "It is No Secret"
 "I Found a Friend"
 "The Old Rugged Cross"
 "Rock of Ages"
 "Star of Hope"
 "Now the Day Is Over"
 "A Perfect Day"

References 

1962 albums
Jo Stafford albums
Gordon MacRae albums
Capitol Records albums
Contemporary Christian music albums by American artists
Albums conducted by Paul Weston
Vocal duet albums